Thihathu (also known as Min Yin; 1230s–1256) was the crown prince of the Pagan dynasty of Burma (Myanmar) from 1251 to 1256. The prince was the senior of the two sons of King Uzana. He was seen as an arrogant, rude prince by the court led by the Chief Minister Yazathingyan. Chronicles say that the prince once spat on Yazathingyan, someone three decades his senior. When Uzana died from a hunting accident in May 1256, Yazathingyan persuaded the court to give the throne to Narathihapate, the fallen king's only other son by a concubine. The court arrested Thihathu, and presumably put him to death.

References

Bibliography
 
 

Pagan dynasty
Heirs to the Burmese throne
Heirs apparent who never acceded
13th-century Burmese people